Atlit is a coastal town located south of Haifa, Israel. The community is in the Hof HaCarmel Regional Council in the Haifa District of Israel. 

Off the coast of Atlit is a submerged Neolithic village. The town of Atlit is named after the nearby Crusader outpost and fortified town of Atlit, also known as Château Pèlerin, which although in ruins remained populated until 1948.

The town was established in 1903 under the auspices of Baron Edmond de Rothschild, approximately two kilometers south of the historical site which was then a small Palestinian village. The Atlit detainee camp is nearby, which was used by the British to intern Jewish refugees and is now a museum. From 1950 until the unification of the municipalities in 2003, Atlit was a local council whose jurisdiction was 14,000 dunams.

History

Neolithic

Atlit Yam is an ancient submerged Neolithic village off the coast of Atlit. Atlit-Yam provides the earliest known evidence for an agro-pastoral-marine subsistence system on the Levantine coast.

Bronze Age
Atlit shows evidence of human habitation since the early Bronze Age.

Crusader period

The Crusaders built the historical settlement of Atlit, also known as Château Pèlerin. It was the one of the largest citadels in the Holy Land, and became the last remaining Crusader outpost (see also: Fall of Ruad), remaining in Crusader's hands until 1291.

The ruins of the citadel are still visible in modern times. Immediately to the north also lies a large medieval Christian cemetery hosting the graves of men, women and children who lived in the surrounding during the 13th century.

Foundation
 
In 1903, Jewish settlers began to built a nearby village approximately 2 km south of the ancient site which they also called Atlit. The village was established by Edmond James de Rothschild, with most of the land bought from Arab fishermen. A hundred families settled there but much of it was swampland, and many residents succumbed to malaria. Aaron Aaronsohn established an agricultural station in Atlit in 1911, and during World War I the village was used as a base by the Nili organisation.

British Mandate period

In the 1922 census of Palestine, during the British Mandate of Palestine period Athlit Colony had a population of 78 Jews and 3 Muslims, while Athlit Salt works had a population of 196 Jews, 1 Muslim and 1 Christian. 

The population of the wider had increased in the 1931 census to 413 Muslims, 496 Jews and 39 Christians; in a total of 193 houses; in addition to historical Atlit, this included Atlit Salt Co., Atlit Labour Group, Atlit Quarry, Aaronson Farm, Atlit Station and Atlit Police Post.

The Arab presence underwent a sharp decline in the 1940s due to land sales, so that by the 1945 statistics there were only 150 Arabs still living there (90 Muslims and 60 Christians) alongside 510 Jews.

State of Israel
The circumstances under which the remaining Arabs left in 1948 are unknown. The Atlit detainee camp was used by the British authorities to detain Jewish migrants to Palestine. 

It is now a museum of the Ha'apala (illegal Jewish immigration 1934–48). The headquarters of Shayetet 13 marine commandos is located at Atlit naval base on the Atlit promontory, placing the Crusader ruins there off-limits for regular visitors.

Atlit was declared a local council in 1950, but in 2004 was incorporated in the Hof HaCarmel Regional Council as one of a handful of Regional Committees. The late Knesset member Pesah Grupper lived in Atlit. He was head of its local council in the years 1959–1962 and 1969–1971.

Archaeology 
In August 2021, marine archeologists headed by Yaakov Sharvit from Israel Antiquities Authority announced the discovery of 1,700-year-old coins weighing a total of 6 kg., dated back to the 4th century AD. According to Sharvit, coins demonstrated that they were assembled together and agglutinated because of oxidation of the metals.

Neighborhoods
Neighborhoods in Atlit are Neve Moshe, Yamit, Giv'at HaPrahim, Giv'at HaBrekhot, Giv'at Sharon, Shoshanat HaYam, HaGoren, Yafe Nof, Argaman, Hofit, Savyonei Atlit and Allon. Atlit is in immediate vicinity of the villages Neve Yam and Ein Carmel.

Twin towns
 Nardò (Italy)

See also
Atlit naval base

References

Bibliography

 p. 281
 

 
 Irby and Mangles, 1823, p. 191

External links 
Official Atlit Community Website
Welcome To 'Atlit
'Atlit, from Zochrot
Survey of Western Palestine, Map 5: IAA, Wikimedia commons

 
Jewish villages in the Ottoman Empire
Populated places established in 1903
1903 establishments in the Ottoman Empire
Populated places in Haifa District